Enaretta paulinoi is a species of beetle in the family Cerambycidae. It was described by Quedenfeldt in 1855.

References

Enaretta
Beetles described in 1855